Al-Haffah is a town in northwestern Syria administratively belonging to the Latakia Governorate, located  east of Latakia. It is the centre of al-Haffah District, one of the four districts (mantiqah) of the Latakia Goverorate. Together with the surrounding villages in the al-Haffa subdistrict (nahiya) greater al-Haffa had a population of 23,347. Half of the town's inhabitants are Sunni Muslim, about 40% are Alawite, while Christians constitute about 10% of the population. The communities have lived together in al-Haffah for centuries.

The residents of al-Haffa are largely involved in agriculture. The town produces many types of fruits such as olive, fig, pomegranate, apple and pear.

History
Al-Haffa is surrounded with mountains and located just 7 km to the west of Salah Ed-Din Castle, a UNESCO World Heritage Site. The area has an ancient history starting with the settlement of the Phoenicians. Later on, it became a strategic point for the invading Crusaders.

Syrian geographer Yaqut al-Hamawi visited al-Haffah in the early 13th-century, during Ayyubid rule, and noted that it was a district to the west of Halab (Aleppo), comprising many villages. The cloths called Haffiyyah come from here ..."

In 1919 al-Haffah was part of the mini-revolt led by Umar al-Bitar in the Sahyun region of which al-Haffah was the center. Around this time, it joined the revolt of Saleh al-Ali which was in alliance with al-Bitar.

References

Bibliography

Cities in Syria
Populated places in al-Haffah District
Alawite communities in Syria